Lang-Hess House is a historic home located at Wheeling, Ohio County, West Virginia. It was built about 1865, and is a two-story sandstone building with Italianate design details. An attached ‘sun porch’ was added to the house about 1935.  Its builder was associated with the architect and engineers of the Wheeling Suspension Bridge, and is believed to have used “extra” sandstone to build his residence following the work on bridge.

It was listed on the National Register of Historic Places in 2006.

References

Houses in Wheeling, West Virginia
Houses on the National Register of Historic Places in West Virginia
Houses completed in 1865
Italianate architecture in West Virginia
National Register of Historic Places in Wheeling, West Virginia
Stone houses in West Virginia